Taras may refer to:

Geography
 Taras (ancient city) of Magna Graecia, modern-day Taranto
 Taras, Iran, a village in Tehran province
 Taras, Łódź Voivodeship, Poland
 Taraš, a village in Vojvodina, Serbia
 Taras, Kazakhstan, a village in Almaty Region

People
 Taras (name), a Ukrainian male given name
 Taras (surname)

Other uses
 Taras (mythology), in Greek mythology the son of Poseidon and the nymph Satyrion

See also 
 Taraz, a city in Jambyl Region, Kazakhstan